Cajuru is a municipality in the state of São Paulo in Brazil. The population is 26,393 (2020 est.) in an area of 660 km². The elevation is 775 m.

References

Municipalities in São Paulo (state)